A spring rider or spring rocker is a bouncy, outdoors playing device, invented in the 1970s in Denmark. It mainly consists of a metal spring beneath a plastic or wooden central beam or flange, with 1 to 4 plastic or fiberglass seats above it. When a person sits on it, the structure moves and bounces. Spring riders are common in many playgrounds. They are often designed to look like an animal or a vehicle.

Prior to this, the horse spring toy was patented in 1956 in Pasco, Washington.
This toy is commonly known as a rocking horse or spring toy. This is because it has a great resemblance to these things.

References

External links

 Vintage Spring Riders – gallery of spring riders circa 1950–1980

 Playground equipment